The spider-tailed horned viper (Pseudocerastes urarachnoides) is a species of viper, a venomous snake, in the family Viperidae and genus Pseudocerastes. The genus is commonly known as "false-horned vipers".

The species is endemic to western Iran and over the border region with Iraq, and was originally described in 2006. The head looks very similar to that of other Pseudocerastes species in the region, but the spider-tailed horned viper has a unique tail that has a bulb-like end that is bordered by long drooping scales that give it the appearance of a spider. The tail tip is waved around and used to lure insectivorous birds to within striking range.

Etymology
The specific name, urarachnoides, is derived from Ancient Greek ( tail +  spider +  like), and refers to this snake's spider-like tail tip, as does the common name, spider-tailed horned viper.

Description
Like other vipers in the genus Pseudocerastes, the scales above the eyes rise up to give P. urarachnoides a horned appearance. A specimen had been collected in 1968 as part of the Second Street Expedition to Iran and deposited in the Field Museum of Natural History at Chicago, identified as Pseudocerastes persicus. It was, however, found to be distinct, and it was described as a new species in 2006. The species is distinguished by a number of characteristics. There are about 16 to 17 scales between the horns, and the scales on the body above are rougher than on other species in the genus. There are 15 pairs of subcaudal scales, and the scales on the sides of the tail are elongated and appear like appendages of an arthropod. The tip of the tail is inflated into a bulb-like shape.

Mimicry and behaviour
The snake is a superb mimic. The tail resembles a spider or other arachnid, and the authors who described the species speculated that it was used as a lure to attract birds, as a digested lark had been found in the stomach of the paratype specimen.

The tip of the tail is used as a lure in several other species of snake, including Bitis caudalis, Crotalus cerastes, Sistrurus catenatus, Agkistrodon contortrix, Acanthophis antarcticus, Acanthophis praelongus, and Morelia viridis, but none of these examples has the unique elongated scales that give it the appearance of arthropod appendages. The actual use of the tail to lure birds (an example of caudal luring) has been confirmed in field studies; the tail is moved in a figure-of-eight pattern.

Footage of the spider-tailed horned viper using its tail to lure a migrating bird featured in the Asia episode of the BBC series Seven Worlds, One Planet narrated by David Attenborough.

Distribution
This species overlaps in distribution with P. fieldi in Gilan-e Gharb, next to Qasr-e Shirin, Kermanshah, and with P. persicus in Bina and Bijar, Ilam Province.

Taxonomy
Molecular studies based on cytochrome b show it to be closer to Pseudocerastes persicus than to P. fieldi.

References

External links

Footage of the spider-tailed horned viper using its tail to lure a migrating bird featured in the Asia episode of the BBC series Seven Worlds, One Planet

Viperinae
Endemic fauna of Iran
Reptiles of Iran
Reptiles described in 2006
Taxa named by Hamid Bostanchi
Taxa named by Steven C. Anderson
Taxa named by Haji Gholi Kami
Taxa named by Theodore Johnstone Papenfuss